This is a list of Japan Football League transfers made during both winter and summer transfer windows of the 2023 season by each club.

Briobecca Urayasu

Criacao Shinjuku

Honda FC

Kochi United

Maruyasu Okazaki

Minebea Mitsumi

Okinawa SV

Reilac Shiga

ReinMeer Aomori

Sony Sendai

Suzuka Point Getters

Tiamo Hirakata

Tokyo Musashino United

Veertien Mie

Verspah Oita

See also
List of J1 League football transfers 2023
List of J2 League football transfers 2023
List of J3 League football transfers 2023

References

2023
Transfers